Smooth Island is an island in the Australian state of South Australia located off the west coast of Eyre Peninsula  about  south west of the town of Ceduna.  It is both part of a local group of islands known as the Isles of St Francis group and a larger group known as the Nuyts Archipelago.  It has enjoyed protected area status since the 1960s and since 2011, it has been part of the Nuyts Archipelago Wilderness Protection Area.

Description
Smooth Island is an island located within the Isles of St Francis group, which itself is part of the Nuyts Archipelago.

The island is considered to be difficult to access via watercraft in "normal conditions" on the basis of "impressions from a brief flyover" in a helicopter during 1982.

Formation, geology and oceanography
Smooth Island was formed about 7700 years ago when sea levels rose at the start of the Holocene. The island's geology consists of a "granite base and thin calcarenite mantle" that is "likely to be fragmented into jagged rocks and shingles, with a sandy, skeletal soil filling depressions" in areas that are "beyond the reach of storm waves".

History

European discovery and use
Smooth Island is reported as being named by Matthew Flinders in 1802 and was so named because of the "island's shape".  The Baudin expedition to Australia named the island as Ile Malesherbes later in 1802.

Flora and fauna

Flora
As of 1996, the literature suggests that no onsite flora survey had been carried out and accordingly, contains the following description based on an extrapolation of observations carried out on nearby Egg Island.  Saltbush and  nitre-bush should be present where soil pockets exist in the calcarenite capping while an open heath of twiggy daisy-bush should be present over the central part of the island.

Sub tidal flora

Fauna
As of 1996, the literature suggests that no onsite fauna survey had been carried out as the following list is an extrapolation of species present on nearby Egg Island.  Seabird species are likely to be represented by sooty oystercatcher, crested tern and pacific gull as well as visitors such as white-bellied sea-eagle.  Land bird species that are likely to visit the island are the rock parrot and the richard's pipit.  Reptilian species are likely to include the marbled gecko, the four-toed earless skink and the bull skink.

Protected area status

Smooth Island first received protected area status as a fauna reserve declared under the Fauna Conservation Act 1964 and then as a fauna conservation reserve declared under the Crown Lands Act 1929-1966 on 16 March 1967. In 1972, it became part of the Isles of St Francis Conservation Park, which was declared under the National Parks and Wildlife Act 1972 to "conserve island populations and habitat for endangered species".  On 25 August 2011, it and the rest of the Isles of St Francis Conservation Park  was transferred to the newly created Nuyts Archipelago Wilderness Protection Area. As of 2012, the waters adjoining Smooth Island are part of a sanctuary zone within the Nuyts Archipelago Marine Park.

See also
List of islands of Australia

Citations and references

Citations

References

	

Islands of South Australia
Uninhabited islands of Australia
Great Australian Bight